Sonia Mazey (born 1958) is a New Zealand political science academic. She is currently a full professor at the University of Canterbury.

Academic career
After a PhD titled  'The theory and practice of the 1972 French regional reform 1972-1980, with special reference to Brittany : an example of incremental decision making'  at the University of Oxford, she moved to the University of Canterbury, rising to full professor.

Selected works
 Mazey, Sonia, and Jeremy John Richardson, eds. Lobbying in the European community. Oxford University Press, 1993.
 Mazey, Sonia, and Jeremy Richardson. "Interest groups and EU policy-making." European Union: Power and Policy-Making, Nueva York, Routledge (2006): 247–265.
 Mazey, Sonia. "The European Union and women's rights: from the Europeanization of national agendas to the nationalization of a European agenda?." Journal of European Public Policy 5, no. 1 (1998): 131–152.
 Mazey, Sonia. "Introduction: Integrating gender-intellectual and'real world'mainstreaming." (2000): 333–345.
 Mazey, Sonia, and Jeremy Richardson. "The Commission and the lobby." The European Commission (1994): 169–201.

References

External links
  
 

Living people
1958 births
New Zealand women academics
Alumni of the University of Oxford
Academic staff of the University of Canterbury
New Zealand political scientists
Women political scientists